The sarod is a stringed instrument, used in Hindustani music on the Indian subcontinent. Along with the sitar, it is among the most popular and prominent instruments. It is known for a deep, weighty, introspective sound, in contrast with the sweet, overtone-rich texture of the sitar, with sympathetic strings that give it a resonant, reverberant quality. A fretless instrument, it can produce the continuous slides between notes known as meend (glissandi), which are important in Indian music.

Origins

The word sarod, which comes from the Persian, is much older than the Indian musical instrument. It can be traced back to sorūd meaning "song", "melody", "hymn" and further to the Persian verb sorūdan, which correspondingly means "to sing", "to play a musical instrument", but also means "to compose".

Alternatively, the shahrud may have given its name to the sarod. The Persian word šāh-rūd is made up of šāh (shah or king) and rūd (string). 

Many scholars of Indian classical music believe that the sarod is a combination of the ancient chitravina, the medieval Indian rabab (aka the seniya rabab) and modern sursingar. Some scholars contend that a similar instrument may have existed about two thousand years ago in ancient India during the ages of the Gupta kings. In fact, a Gupta period coin depicts the great king Samudragupta playing a veena, which many believe to be the precursor of the sarod. The present Indian Traces of similar Rabab style instruments can also be found in southern India, especially in the states of Tamil Nadu, Kerala and Karnataka, where it is known as the swarbat. The folk rabab, an instrument popular in north India, had a wooden fingerboard, its strings were made of silk, cotton or gut, and it was played with a wooden pick. In history, reference is also made to a Sharadiya Veena from which the name Sarod have been derived. The sarod is also believed to have descended from the Afghan rubab, a similar instrument originating in Central Asia and Afghanistan.

Although the sarod has been referred to as a "bass rubab" its tonal bandwidth is actually considerably greater than that of the rubab, especially in the middle and high registers. Lalmani Misra opines in his Bharatiya Sangeet Vadya that the sarod is a combination of the ancient chitravina, the medieval rubab and modern sursingar. Another instrument, the sur-rabab, is known to exist, which has the characteristics of both the dhrupad rabab/seniya rabab and the sarod. The sur-rabab has the structure of the dhrupad rabab but has a metal fretboard and uses metal strings.

Among the many conflicting and contested histories of the sarod, there is one that attributes its invention to the ancestors of the present-day sarod maestro, Amjad Ali Khan. Amjad Ali Khan’s ancestor Mohammad Hashmi Khan Bangash, a musician and horse trader, came to India with the Afghan rubab in the mid-18th century, and became a court musician to the Maharajah of Rewa (now in Madhya Pradesh). It was his descendants, notably his grandson Ghulam Ali Khan Bangash, a court musician in Gwalior, who changed the rubab into the sarod we know today. A parallel theory credits descendants of Madar Khan, Niyamatullah Khan in particular, with the same innovation around 1820. The sarod in its present form dates back to approximately 1820, when it started gaining recognition as a serious instrument in Rewa, Shahjahanpur, Gwalior and Lucknow. In the 20th century, the sarod was improved significantly by  Allauddin Khan and his brother Ayet Ali Khan. They increased the number of chikari (drone) strings and increased the number of tarafdar (sympathetic) strings. However, as is the case with most young, evolving instruments, much work remains to be done in the area of sarod luthiery in order to achieve reliable customization, and precise replication of successful instruments. This reflects the general state of Indian instrument-making in the present day.

Design

The design of the instrument depends on the school (gharana) of playing. There are three distinguishable types:

The conventional sarod is a 17 to 25-stringed lute-like instrument—four to five main strings used for playing the melody, one or two drone strings, two chikari strings and nine to eleven sympathetic strings. The design of this early model is generally credited to Niyamatullah Khan of the Lucknow Gharana as well as Ghulam Ali Khan of the Gwalior-Bangash Gharana. Among the contemporary sarod players, this basic design is kept intact by two streams of sarod playing. Amjad Ali Khan and his disciples play this model, as do the followers of Radhika Mohan Maitra. Both Amjad Ali Khan and Buddhadev Dasgupta have introduced minor changes to their respective instruments which have become the design templates for their followers. Both musicians use sarods made of teak wood, and a soundboard made of goat skin stretched across the face of the resonator. Buddhadev Dasgupta prefers a polished stainless steel fingerboard for the ease of maintenance while Amjad Ali Khan uses the conventional chrome or nickel-plated cast steel fingerboard. Visually, the two variants are similar, with six pegs in the main pegbox, two rounded chikari pegs and 11 (Amjad) to 15 (Buddhadev) sympathetic strings. The descendants of Niyamatullah Khan (namely Irfan Khan and Ghulfam Khan) also play similar instruments. Some of the followers of Radhika Mohan Maitra still carry the second resonator on their sarods. Amjad Ali Khan and his followers have rejected the resonator altogether. These instruments are typically tuned to B, which is the traditional setting.

Another type is that designed by Allauddin Khan and his brother Ayet Ali Khan. This instrument, referred to by David Trasoff as the 1934 Maihar Prototype, is larger and longer than the conventional instrument, though the fingerboard is identical to the traditional sarod. This instrument has 25 strings in all. These include four main strings, four jod strings (tuned to Ni or Dha, R/r, G/g and Sa respectively), two chikari strings (tuned to Sa of the upper octave) and fifteen tarab strings. The main strings are tuned to Ma ("fa"), Sa ("do"), lower Pa ("so") and lower Sa, giving the instrument a range of three octaves. The Maihar sarod lends itself extremely well to the presentation of alap with the four jod strings providing a backdrop for the ambiance of the raga. This variant is, however, not conducive to the performance of clean right-hand picking on individual strings. The instrument is typically tuned to C.

Sarod strings are either made of steel or phosphor bronze. Most contemporary sarod players use German or American-made strings, such as Roslau (Germany), Pyramid (Germany) and Precision (USA). The strings are plucked with a triangular plectrum (java) made of polished coconut shell, ebony, cocobolo wood, horn, cowbone, Delrin or other such materials. Early sarod players used plain wire plectrums, which yielded a soft, ringing tone.

Playing technique
The lack of frets and the tension of the strings make the sarod a very demanding instrument to play, as the strings must be pressed hard against the fingerboard.

There are two approaches to stopping the strings of the sarod. One involves using the tip of one's fingernails to stop the strings, and the other uses a combination of the nail and the fingertip to stop the strings against the fingerboard.

Fingering techniques and how they are taught depends largely on the personal preferences of musicians rather than on the basis of school affiliation. Radhika Mohan Maitra, for example, used the index, middle and ring finger of his left hand to stop the string, just like followers of Allauddin Khan do. Maitra, however, made much more extensive use of the third fingernail for slides and hammers. Amjad Ali Khan, while a member of approximately the same stylistic school as Radhika Mohan, prefers to use just the index and middle fingers of his left hand. Amjad Ali is, however, pictured circa 1960 playing with all three fingers.

Notable sarodiyas

Deceased
 Mohammad Amir Khan (1873–1934), Court Musician of Darbhanga and Rajshahi

 Allauddin Khan (1862–1972)
 Hafiz Ali Khan (1888–1972)
 Ali Akbar Khan (1922–2009)
 Bahadur Khan (1931–1989)
 Buddhadev Das Gupta (1933–2018)
 Kalyan Mukherjea (1943–2010)
 Sakhawat Hussain (1877–1955)
 Sharan Rani Backliwal (1929–2008)
 Radhika Mohan Maitra (1917–1981)
 Vasant Rai (1942–1985)
 Shahadat Hossain Khan (1958–2020)

Living
 Rajeev Taranath (b. 1932)
 Aashish Khan (b. 1939)
 Amjad Ali Khan (b. 1945)
 Brij Narayan (b. 1952)
 Narendra Nath Dhar (b. 1954)
 Biswajit Roy Chowdhury (b. 1956)
 Vikash Maharaj (b.1957).                    
 Tejendra Majumdar (b. 1961)
 Amaan Ali Khan (b. 1977)
 Ayaan Ali Khan (b. 1979)
 Abhisek Lahiri (b. 1983)
 Abanindra Maitra (b.1953)
 Wajahat Khan
 Arnab Chakrabarty
 Soumik Datta
 Prithwidev Bhattacharyya
 Abhishek Borkar
 Debanjan Bhattacharjee
 Debasmita Bhattacharya
 Vishal Maharaj (b. 1986)
 Rajeeb Chakraborty
 Prattyush Banerjee
 Aayush Mohan (b. 1995)
  Rupa Neupane  (A. Nepal)

See also
 Hindustani classical music
 Music of India
 Plucked string instrument
 String instruments

References

Further reading
 

Drumhead lutes
Hindustani musical instruments
Necked bowl lutes
 
String instruments with sympathetic strings